Denaby is a civil parish in the Metropolitan Borough of Doncaster in South Yorkshire, England.  It has a population of 326, increasing slightly to 329 at the 2011 Census.   The only village in the parish, historically known as Denaby, is now known as Old Denaby to distinguish it from Denaby Main, which lies outside the parish to the east in the unparished area of Mexborough and Conisbrough. Old Denaby is in the Parliamentary constituency of Don Valley.

References

Civil parishes in South Yorkshire
Geography of the Metropolitan Borough of Doncaster